Jessica Pegula (born February 24, 1994) is an American professional tennis player. She has a career-high WTA rankings in singles and doubles of world No. 3, both achieved on October 24, 2022. She has won two singles titles and six doubles titles on the WTA Tour, one WTA Challenger doubles title, and seven ITF doubles titles. She is a five-time Grand Slam quarterfinalist in singles, having reached this stage thrice at the Australian Open (2021–2023), once at the 2022 French Open, and once at the 2022 US Open. She is also a major finalist in doubles, achieving this feat at the 2022 French Open with teammate Coco Gauff.

Personal life
Pegula is the daughter of Terry and Kim Pegula, who are the multi-billionaire owners of the Buffalo Bills of the National Football League and the Buffalo Sabres of the National Hockey League. She is half-Korean, as her mother was born in Seoul before being adopted at age 5. She has four siblings: Kelly, Matthew, Michael, and Laura (the latter two from her father's first marriage).

In 2021, Pegula married Taylor Gahagen, a corporate executive for Pegula Sports and Entertainment and an animal philanthropist.

In August 2016, it was announced that Pegula and her sister would be opening a quick-serve restaurant called Healthy Scratch in LECOM Harborcenter, an ice hockey-themed mixed-use development owned by her parents in Buffalo, New York. The Healthy Scratch business was to be expanded to food truck service in 2017. In 2017, Pegula introduced her own skin-care line called Ready 24.

Professional career

2011–2012: Grand Slam doubles third round
On August 30, 2011, Pegula was granted a wild card into the main draw of the US Open doubles tournament where she was paired with Taylor Townsend. They eventually lost in the third round to the third-seeded team of Vania King and Yaroslava Shvedova.

In March 2012, Pegula was handed a wild card to the qualifying draw in Indian Wells, and surprised higher ranked players Bojana Jovanovski and Paula Ormaechea to qualify for the main draw where she lost to Magdaléna Rybáriková in three sets.

2015: Grand Slam singles debut, first win
Pegula made her major singles debut at the US Open as a qualifier. She defeated Shuko Aoyama, Margarita Gasparyan and Melanie Oudin to reach the main draw where she beat Alison Van Uytvanck in the first round. In the second, Pegula was defeated by Dominika Cibulková, in three sets.

2018: First WTA final and top 125
In 2018, Pegula reached her first WTA singles final at the Tournoi de Québec in September as a qualifier. She beat Kristýna Plíšková, Ons Jabeur, second seed Petra Martić and fifth seed Sofia Kenin en route to the final, where she lost to eighth seed Pauline Parmentier in straight sets. This brought her ranking back inside the top 200 and helped her finish the year inside the top 125.

2019: First WTA title and top 100
Pegula began the year primarily playing on the ITF Circuit, before cracking inside the top 100 in February for the first time in her career. This allowed her to enter several larger WTA Tour events, including in Indian Wells and Miami. Her best result during the early clay court season came in Charleston, where she upset world No. 12, Anastasija Sevastova, en-route to the third round. This helped her break inside the top 75 for the first time. She also competed in the main draw of a Grand Slam tournament other than the US Open for the first time. She was defeated in the first round of the French Open by eventual champion Ashleigh Barty before falling in the same stage at Wimbledon to Mihaela Buzărnescu.

Pegula achieved the best result of her career at the start of the North American hardcourt season when she won her first WTA career singles title at the Washington Open, defeating Camila Giorgi in the final. This took her to a new career-high ranking of world no. 55. Despite failing to win another main draw match the rest of the season, Pegula finished the year ranked inside the top 100 for the first time, at No. 76.

2020: Auckland Open final, top 60
Jessica started her 2020 tennis season at the Auckland Open where she defeated CiCi Bellis in the first round. She followed this up with two more straight set victories over Tamara Zidanšek and Alizé Cornet to reach the semifinals. There she beat Caroline Wozniacki in three sets to advance to her third career WTA singles final. Facing off against 23-time Grand Slam singles winner Serena Williams for the first time, Pegula lost in straight sets. She then competed at the Australian Open for the first time, where she was defeated by another American, Taylor Townsend, in straight sets in the first round.

Pegula's next big triumph came at the Cincinnati Open, a Premier 5 tournament. Having already beaten two Russians to qualify for the main draw, she opened her campaign with a straight sets win over American Jennifer Brady followed by a win over another countrywoman, 2019 French Open semifinalist Amanda Anisimova. She then caused a huge upset by defeating fifth seed and world No. 11, Aryna Sabalenka, in the third round, thus advancing to her first quarterfinal at any WTA Premier level event. Her run came to an end with a straight-sets loss to 14th seed Elise Mertens. This took her ranking back inside the top 65.

At the US Open, Pegula recovered from a set down to record her first Grand Slam main-draw win since the 2015 US Open, defeating Marie Bouzková in a third-set tiebreak. She then beat Kirsten Flipkens to advance to the third round of a Grand Slam event for the first time, where she lost to sixth seed and former world No. 2, Petra Kvitová.

2021: First major quarterfinal, top 20

Pegula attained major success at the Australian Open, defeating former Australian Open champion and 12th seed Victoria Azarenka, Kristina Mladenovic, former US Open champion Samantha Stosur and fifth seed Elina Svitolina to reach her first Grand Slam quarterfinal where she lost to eventual runner-up, Jennifer Brady, despite winning the first set. This strong showing allowed Pegula to enter top 50 for the first time, and took her to a new career-high ranking of world No. 43.

Later in April, she achieved another career-high of world No. 32, after reaching the semifinals at the Qatar Open as a qualifier where she lost to the eventual champion, Petra Kvitová and a fourth-round run as a seeded player at the Miami Open, losing to Maria Sakkari in a tight three-set match. Her third-round win over Karolína Plíšková in Miami was the third win in a row in three tournaments over the same player.

In May, at the Italian Open, where she participated for the first time, she recorded the biggest victory of her career over world No. 2, Naomi Osaka, in the second round. This was her fifth top-ten win in 2021 and in her career. She next prevailed over Ekaterina Alexandrova to set up a quarterfinal with Petra Martić. Thanks to this great showing at her second WTA 1000 quarterfinal in 2021, after the one at Dubai, she entered top 30 for the first time.

At the French Open, she reached the third round for the first time in her career where she lost to fourth seed Sofia Kenin. At the German Open in Berlin, Pegula reached the quarterfinals defeating for the fourth time Karolína Plíšková in their fourth in a row meeting in 2021. As a result, she entered the top 25 on June 21, 2021.

She reached her third WTA 1000 quarterfinal of 2021 at the Canadian Open edition in Montreal, defeating compatriot Danielle Collins in a close three set match needing six match points to win in a thrilling finish. She then went on to reach her first WTA 1000 semifinal and second semifinal for the season, defeating 13th seed Ons Jabeur in 88 minutes.
At the US Open, she reached the third round for a second consecutive year. At Indian Wells, she reached her fourth WTA 1000 quarterfinal, defeating world No. 7 (her 7th top-ten win for the season) and fourth seed, Elina Svitolina, before she lost to former two-time champion Victoria Azarenka.

2022: First WTA 1000 title, World No. 3 & WTA Finals in singles and doubles
Pegula started her season in Melbourne, where she lost to Irina-Camelia Begu in the first round of the singles tournament but won her first career WTA doubles title with Asia Muhammad, beating former doubles world No. 1, Sara Errani, and Jasmine Paolini, in the final. In Sydney, she lost to Caroline Garcia in the first round.

At the Australian Open, she defeated Anhelina Kalinina, Bernarda Pera, Nuria Párrizas Díaz and fifth seed Maria Sakkari to reach her second consecutive quarterfinal at this major. She lost the quarterfinal match to world No. 1 and eventual champion, Ash Barty, but moved to highest rankings in singles (No. 16) and doubles (No. 41) on January 31, 2022.

In Doha, she won her second doubles title (and first at the WTA 1000 level) with Coco Gauff, defeating third seeds Elise Mertens and Veronika Kudermetova in the final. As a result, she reached the top 30 in doubles at No. 29 on 28 February 2022.

At the Miami Open, she reached her second WTA 1000 semifinal of her career after two back-to-back retirements, Kalinina in round of 16 and Paula Badosa in the first set of the quarterfinal. In the semifinals, she lost to the eventual champion and upcoming No. 1, Iga Świątek in straight sets.

She reached her seventh WTA 1000 quarterfinal at the Madrid Open defeating Bianca Andreescu, in straight sets. She reached her third semifinal at the WTA 1000-level and second straight for the season defeating first time Madrid quarterfinalist Sara Sorribes Tormo. Next she defeated Jil Teichmann to reach her first WTA 1000 final and become the third American to do so after Venus Williams (2010) and Serena Williams (2012 and 2013) in Madrid, where she lost to Ons Jabeur in three sets. As a result, she improved her career-high ranking to world No. 11 on 9 May 2022. Pegula reached the third round of the Italian Open as well, but lost to Aryna Sabalenka in straight sets.

Seeded 11th at the French Open, Pegula reached the quarterfinals for the first time at this major, defeating former world No. 12 Wang Qiang, Anhelina Kalinina, 2021 French Open semifinalist and 24th seed Tamara Zidansek, and Irina-Camelia Begu. She lost to top seed and eventual champion Iga Światek in the quarterfinals. As a result, she broke into the top 10 in the singles rankings for the first time, at world No. 8 on 6 June 2022. She also reached her first major final in doubles, partnering with Gauff. As a result, she reached top 15 in the doubles rankings. Seeded eighth at Wimbledon, she advanced to the third round for the first time, before losing to Petra Martić in straight sets. Following Wimbledon, she reached a new career-high ranking of world No. 7 on 18 July 2022 becoming the American No. 1 player, one spot ahead of Danielle Collins.

As a top-seeded pair, partnering Erin Routliffe, she won her third doubles title at the Washington Open defeating fourth seeds Caty McNally and Anna Kalinskaya.

Seeded seventh at the Canadian Open, she reached back-to-back semifinals in singles, for the fourth time at the WTA 1000 level in her career and third for the season, defeating defending champion Camila Giorgi and Yulia Putintseva before losing to Simona Halep. Seeded third in doubles at the same tournament, she also reached the semifinals with Gauff defeating fifth seeds Desirae Krawczyk and Demi Schuurs. Next they defeated Madison Keys / Sania Mirza in the semifinals and Nicole Melichar / Ellen Perez in the final to win their second WTA 1000 title together. As a result, Pegula reached top 10 in the doubles rankings, at world No. 8.

At the Cincinnati Open, she reached back-to-back quarterfinals defeating tenth seed Emma Raducanu, her fourth WTA 1000 quarterfinal of the season.

Seeded eighth at the US Open, she reached the fourth round, defeating Viktorija Golubic, Aliaksandra Sasnovich, and qualifier Yue Yuan. Next she defeated 21st seed Petra Kvitová to reach her first quarterfinal at her home Grand Slam championship and the third major quarterfinal of the season, where she lost to world No. 1 Światek for the third time this year. Despite the result, she moved to world No. 5, on 12 September 2022. On 13 and 14 October 2022, she qualified for the 2022 WTA Finals in singles and doubles with Gauff respectively, becoming the first American to qualify for the WTA Finals since Sloane Stephens in 2018 and the first American to qualify in both singles in doubles since Serena and Venus Williams in 2009. At the San Diego Open, Pegula lost to Światek in a US Open rematch in the semifinals, but won the doubles title with Gauff, their third title of the season together and Pegula's fifth doubles title overall. As a result, she reached a new career-high doubles ranking of world No. 4, on 17 October 2022.

At the Guadalajara Open, she reached her second final at the WTA 1000 level defeating four former Grand Slam champions Elena Rybakina, Bianca Andreescu, and Sloane Stephens in the quarterfinals, and Victoria Azarenka in the semifinals. She defeated fourth seed Maria Sakkari in straight sets to win her second and biggest singles title of her career, becoming the first American woman to win a WTA 1000 title since Madison Keys in 2019. At the same tournament, she also reached the quarterfinals in doubles with Gauff. As a result, she achieved new career-high rankings of world No. 3, in singles and in doubles, on 24 October 2022.

At the WTA Finals, Pegula lost all her matches of the group stage, winning only one set in three matches. At the same tournament, she and partner Gauff surprisingly failed to win a single match and also finished last in the round-robin stage of doubles. Nonetheless, she finished her best season to date ranked No. 3 in singles and No. 6 in doubles, one of only three women (along with Gauff and Veronika Kudermetova) to finish inside the top 10 in both disciplines.

2023: First WTA 500 final
Pegula began her season playing at the inaugural edition of the United Cup. After dropping her opening match in Group C to Petra Kvitová, she bounced back to defeat Laura Siegemund. She then beat Harriet Dart in the first knockout stage before scoring the biggest win of her career with a straight sets victory over Iga Światek, her first win over a current World No. 1 and first against the Pole since the 2019 Citi Open. In the finals, she beat 2022 French Open semifinalist Martina Trevisan to help the United States win the first ever United Cup title.

Coming off the heels of her win over Światek and consistency throughout the 2022 season, Pegula was considered one of the favorites for the Australian Open title. She breezed through her first three matches with straight set wins over Jaqueline Cristian, Aliaksandra Sasnovich, and Marta Kostyuk. In the fourth round, Pegula faced off against 2021 French Open champion Barbora Krejčíková for the first time, defeating the 20th seed in straight sets to advance to her third consecutive Australian Open quarterfinal. However, she was unable to advance past that stage once more, being defeated by former champion Victoria Azarenka in straight sets. Pegula also played doubles with Coco Gauff; seeded second, the pairing dropped only one set en route to the semifinals before falling to the tenth seeds Shuko Aoyama and Ena Shibahara.

In February, Pegula reached the finals of the WTA Qatar Open in both singles and doubles. It was Pegula's first WTA 500 singles final. She defeated former French Open champion Jelena Ostapenko and world number two Petra Kvitova en route to the final before losing to top-ranked Iga Swiatek in straight sets. In doubles she and Coco Gauff successfully defended their doubles title. They defeated second seeds Lyudmyla Kichenok and Jelena Ostapenko in a three sets. Pegula earned 305 singles and 470 doubles ranking points.

At the 2023 BNP Paribas Open she reached the fourth round defeating 27th seed Anastasia Potapova coming from a set down.

Career statistics

Grand Slam performance timelines

Singles
Current through the 2023 Australian Open.

Doubles
Current through the 2023 Australian Open.

Grand Slam tournament finals

Doubles: 1 (runner-up)

World TeamTennis
Pegula made her World TeamTennis debut in 2020 joining the Orlando Storm at the start of the season, which was played at The Greenbrier.

Pegula emerged as one of the top players in the WTT 2020 season. After the dismissal of Danielle Collins, Pegula went on to play women's singles, women's doubles with Darija Jurak, and mixed doubles with Ken Skupski and Tennys Sandgren. She posted a strong 9–2 record in singles to help the Storm earn a No. 3 seed in the WTT Playoffs. The Storm would ultimately fall to the Chicago Smash in the semifinals.

References

External links
 
 

American female tennis players
1994 births
Living people
Tennis people from New York (state)
Sportspeople from Buffalo, New York
American socialites
American people of South Korean descent
American sportspeople of Korean descent
Sportspeople from Boca Raton, Florida
Tennis people from Florida
Olympic tennis players of the United States
Tennis players at the 2020 Summer Olympics
21st-century American women
University of Pittsburgh alumni